The Miss Macau 2009 pageant was held in the Cotai Arena on October 17, 2009. Ten delegates completed for the title. The winner was Florence Loi, who competed at Miss International 2008.

Results

Placements

Special awards
Miss Photogenic: #10 Laura Li
Miss Friendship: #8 Sarah Leyshan
The Most Stylish and Glamorous Hair Award: #1 Joyce Huang

Judges
 Manuel Gonçalves
 Patricia Cheong, Miss Macau 1986
 Angela Leong
 Gwennie Tam
 Bernice Jan Liu, Miss Chinese International 2001
 Kevin Cheng
 Luis Mesquita de Melo

Contestant list

Post-Pageant Notes
 Laura Li unplaced in Miss Chinese International Pageant 2010 in Tianjin, China. 
 Sarah Leyshan unplaced in Miss Supranational 2013 in  Minsk, Belarus, but awarded Miss Friendship. 
 Yvonne Yang unplaced in Miss International 2009 in Chengdu, China. She replaced Laura Li.
 Mandy Ye unplaced in Miss International 2010 in Chengdu, China.
 Winnie Sin unplaced in Miss International 2011 in Chengdu, China.
 Winnie Sin unplaced in Miss World 2012 in Ordos City, China, but placed Top 15 at Miss World Talent and Top 24 at Miss World Sport.

References

2009 in Macau
Beauty pageants in Macau